

Locomotive types
Below is a list of the locomotive types saved at Woodham Brothers scrapyard, Barry Island, Wales. They are shown by class, indicating how many of each class were saved.

GWR classes
6 GWR 2800 Class 2-8-0 - No. 2807 was the oldest locomotive to leave Woodham's for preservation in January 1981.
9 GWR 2884 Class 2-8-0
5 GWR 4073 Class Castle class 4-6-0
5 GWR 4200 Class 2-8-0T
2 GWR 4300 Class 2-6-0 - No. 5322 was the first GWR locomotive to leave Woodham's for preservation in March 1969.
2 GWR 4500 Class 2-6-2T
11 GWR 4575 Class 2-6-2T - No. 5553 was the last locomotive to leave Woodham's for preservation in January 1990. 
11 GWR 4900 Class Hall class 4-6-0
10 GWR 5101 Class 2-6-2T
3  GWR 5205 Class 2-8-0T
8 GWR 5600 Class 0-6-2T
6 GWR 5700 Class 0-6-0PT
2 GWR 6000 Class King class 4-6-0
6 GWR 6959 Class Modified Hall class 4-6-0
3 GWR 7200 Class 2-8-2T
8 GWR 7800 Class Manor class 4-6-0
1 GWR 9400 Class 0-6-0PT

Midland classes
1 Midland Railway 3835 Class - No. (4)3924 was the first locomotive to leave Woodham's for preservation in September 1968. It is also the only surviving member of its class left in existence.

Somerset & Dorset joint railway classes
2 S&DJR 7F 2-8-0 - No. 53808 was the first S&DJR locomotive to leave Woodham's for preservation in October 1970.

LMS classes
6 LMS Stanier Class 5 4-6-0 Black 5
2 LMS Jubilee Class 4-6-0
6 LMS Stanier Class 8F 2-8-0
2 LMS Hughes Crab 2-6-0
1 LMS Stanier Mogul 2-6-0 - No. 13268/(4)2968 is now the only surviving member of its class left in existence.
7 LMS Fowler Class 3F Jinty 0-6-0T - No. 47327 was the first LMS locomotive to leave Woodham's for preservation in July 1970
4 LMS Ivatt Class 2 2-6-0
2 LMS Fowler Class 4F 0-6-0
2 LMS Ivatt Class 2 2-6-2T

LNER classes
1 LNER Thompson Class B1 4-6-0 - No. 61264 was the first and only LNER locomotive to leave Woodham's for preservation in July 1976

LSWR classes
2 LSWR S15 class 4-6-0 - No. 30506 was the first LSWR locomotive to leave Woodham's for preservation in April 1976

SECR classes
1 SECR N Class 2-6-0 - No. (3)1874 is the only surviving member of its class left in existence.

SR classes
1 SR Class Q 0-6-0 - No. 30541 is the only surviving member of its class left in existence.
5 SR S15 Class 4-6-0
4 SR U Class 2-6-0 - No 31618 was the first SR locomotive to leave Woodham's for preservation in January 1969
10 SR Merchant Navy Class 4-6-2
18 SR West Country and Battle of Britain Classes 4-6-2 - of these, ten are examples of the 1950s rebuild locos with Walschaerts valve gear and air-smoothed casing removed. These were the most common steam locomotives to be rescued from Barry Scrapyard.

BR Standard classes
4 BR Standard Class 2 2-6-0
4 BR Standard Class 4 2-6-0
14 BR Standard Class 4 2-6-4T- No. 80079 was the first locomotive of the BR standard range to leave Woodham's for preservation in May  1971. These were the second most common steam locomotives to be rescued from Barry Scrapyard. 
4 BR Standard Class 4 4-6-0
4 BR Standard Class 5 4-6-0
1 BR Standard Class 8 4-6-2 71000 Duke of Gloucester - Sole member of its class built.
7 BR Standard Class 9F 2-10-0 - No. 92214 was the youngest locomotive to leave Woodham's for preservation in December 1980.

Preserved locomotives

See also
 Barry Ten

References

 
The Story of Barry (book) by Roger Hardingham
A DVD has also been produced which documents this remarkable story https://www.amazon.co.uk/The-Legend-Barry-Scrapyard-Woodhams/dp/B004CDN74C

External links 

Woodham Brothers website
Story of the Barry scrapyard at the Great Western Society